Osteras may refer to:

Østerås, a village in Akershus, Norway
Østerås (station), the terminal station on the Røa Line of the Oslo Metro, Norway
Audun Østerås (born 1947), Norwegian politician
Itäharju (Swedish: Österås), a district in the Itäharju-Varissuo ward of Turku, Finland

See also
Østerå (disambiguation)